Zaverilal Dalpatram Mehta is an Indian photographer and the recipient of the Padma Sri civilian award in 2018 for his contribution to the fields of literature and educational journalism.

Career 
Zaverilal Mehta has been associated with Gujarat Samachar since the 1980s. He is popular for documenting the life and times of 13 Chief Ministers of Gujarat state, and his lenses have captured incidents such as the 2001 earthquake and the 1998 Kutch cyclone.

In 2018, Zaverilal Mehta was honored with the Padma Shri award by the President of India, Ram Nath Kovind.

References 

Year of birth missing (living people)
Living people
Indian photographers
Indian male journalists
Recipients of the Padma Shri in literature & education
Photographers from Gujarat